The Netherlands Patent Office is the patent office of the Netherlands. It is an agency of the Dutch Ministry of Economic Affairs. The agency is located in the premises of the European Patent Office (EPO), in Rijswijk, near The Hague. The Netherlands Patent Office grants patents in the Netherlands and deals with European patents validated in the Netherlands. It assumes its functions from the rijksoctrooiwet (Royal Patent Act).

Johannes Bob van Benthem was President of the Netherlands Patent Office from 1968 to 1977. Before March 24, 2005, the Netherlands Patent Office was known as the Netherlands Industrial Property Office.

Regional offices in Curaçao and Sint Maarten
According to the rijksoctrooiwet, both Curaçao and Sint Maarten may establish regional offices, that can receive applications for a Dutch patent. Further administrative actions are performed by the Netherlands Patent Office. Curaçao has established the Bureau for Intellectual Property Curaçao as its regional office, while Sint Maarten had as of July 1, 2012 not established one.

Aruba
As Aruba does not take part in the Dutch patent system, it has its own patent and an autonomous patent office: the Bureau Intellectueel Eigendom, based on the Octrooiverordening.

References

External links 

Dutch patent law
Patent offices
Rijswijk